NGC 227 is a lenticular galaxy located approximately 237 million light-years from the Sun in the constellation Cetus. It was discovered on October 1, 1785 by William Herschel.

See also 
 List of NGC objects (1–1000)

References

External links 
 
 
 SEDS

0227
0456
+00-02-135
2547
Lenticular galaxies
Cetus (constellation)
Astronomical objects discovered in 1785
Discoveries by William Herschel